Broadmoor is an unincorporated community in Terrebonne Parish, Louisiana, United States.

References

Unincorporated communities in Louisiana
Acadiana